San Francisco, California in the United States has seen many nicknames over the years. Some are nicknames that have faded in use, while others have evolved over time. The following is a list of notable nicknames:

415 - referring to the area code that serves the city of San Francisco (as well as most of Marin County).
Baghdad by the Bay - title of a book of essays by Herb Caen, and a nickname he used for the city because of the cosmopolitan cultural diversity it shares with the medieval city of Baghdad
Fog City aka "City of Fog"- in reference to San Francisco's famous fog
San Fran - Used by non-native residents and those outside of the Bay Area, particularly on the East Coast and in Europe. Curtis Sparrer from Bospar gives the reasons why it is not acceptable to say 'San Fran'.
Frisco - also the nickname of the St. Louis–San Francisco Railway, disparaged by Herb Caen and some locals, including Emperor Norton, who passed a law against the use of the term. The word is still used today particularly by San Francisco's Black community.
Gay Mecca
Golden Gate City - in reference to the Golden Gate Bridge
SF
SFC (San Francisco City)
Sunset City
The City - used by native San Franciscans and people in the Bay Area.
The City by the Bay – refers to San Francisco Bay
The City of Love – as seen in Cool, Gray City of Love by Gary Kamiya and in the lyrics of "San Francisco" by German eurodance group Cascada
The City that Knows How
The Golden City – in reference to the California Gold Rush and golden brown grass on hillsides in the dry season
The Paris of the West – popular in the early 1900s, but no longer in common use
Thunder Cat City

People from San Francisco
San Franciscan

References

Culture of San Francisco
Nicknames
San Francisco